The IWA Intercontinental Championship is a secondary professional wrestling title defended in Puerto Rico. It was originally  defended in the original International Wrestling Association, later being reintroduced in the World Wrestling League (WWL). The title was used since 2002, when Super Crazy became the first champion, defeating Eddie Guerrero at the very first Ring of Honor event, The Era of Honor Begins, in Philadelphia, Pennsylvania. The championship was modified in 2009, changing the original black belt to another colored red.

In 2021, Fernando Tonos and Manny Ferno created the group La Alianza IWE with the intention of completing a hostile takeover on behalf of International Wrestling Entertainment. Members of the stable won all of the IWA-PR titles. In response, general manager Chicky Starr and Savio Vega introduced parallel titles for each division in March 2022. While the storyline continued, there was a pair of belts contested independently of each other, with the original being referenced to as the "IWE Intercontinental Championship".

History
In early 2015, while Vega was part of La Radio PR's "Más Allá del Ring" show, the title made appearances as part of the studio's decore along the Undisputed World Heavyweight and World Tag Team Championships.

Reintroduced by Savio Vega as part of the main angle of Golpe de Estado 2018, in which he led a group that intended to convert the WWL into the second incarnation of the IWA. At the event, Richard Rondón carried the title with him. Despite IWA failing at Golpe de Estado, the angle was continued. In the meantime, the Intercontinental Championship was featured in an event sponsored by the municipal administration of Naranjito, still lacking formal adjudication.

Reintroduction (2019) 
On June 15, 2019, in Naranjito, Puerto Rico IWA started doing matches to determine a new Intercontinental Champion. the new champion will be determined at Golpe de Estado in Guaynabo, Puerto Rico on September 7, 2019. On August 24 edition of Impacto Total, Chicky Starr announced that Monster Pain would replace Sweet Nasty Papi due he was beaten and unable to participate at the event.

Tournament

Belt designs
The original was crafted by Reggie Parks using acid etching in 2002, it used the same basic template that this craftsman has used in the 1986 WWE Intercontinental Championship belt and other titles in his line. Like those belts, the IWA Intercontinental Heavyweight Championship had a main plate composed by three gilded rectangles of receding size, which due to usage exposed the silver coloring underneath. The central area of the design features a geographical World Map inside a circle, flanked by the same design of six five-pointed stars grouped together. Above and under are three black-colored ribbons, with the upper one prominently reading “INTERCONTINENTAL” and the inferior pair “HEAVYWEIGHT WRESTLING CHAMPION”. The lower part features two eight-pointed stars, an element that is also present in the Parks belts. The crown of the belt has the acronym, “IWA”, inside a trapezoid that is surrounded by leaf motifs. There are four two side square side plates which originally featured designs of wrestlers grappling under the company name. These were replaced with ones that depict the flags of Puerto Rico, Japan, Germany and the United States with their capitalized names over each. The title was modified in 2009, when strap was replaced with a new made of red-colored leather. The template was shared with the IWA Hardcore Championship and later the IWA Puerto Rico/Caribbean Heavyweight Championship.

In 2021, IWA-PR commissioned new belts to commemorate its 20th Anniversary from Collection Spot. The Intercontinental Heavyweight Championship was replaced with an original design, which was based on the original. The new belt featured an oblong central plaque that preserved the World Map and ribbons. However, it introduced two flanking black ribbons which contained five stars and widespread use of heraldic wreath motifs and mantling. The grouping of six stars forming another star, a feature created by Parks and present in many of his designs, was used inside a circle placed at the bottom of the central plaque. The side plates were redesigned to be circular and removing the flags. Both feature maps surrounded by two ribbons with five stars and wreaths, with the left plaque depicting the Western Hemisphere and the right the Eastern Hemisphere. All three plates include a silver-colored IWA logo at the top. Meanwhile, the original belt was repurposed as the IWE Intercontinental Championship with a sticker of the stable's logo being placed over the "IWA" in the crown of the center plate.

Reigns

Combined reigns

References

External links
Wrestling-titles.com

Heavyweight wrestling championships
International Wrestling Association (Puerto Rico) championships